"Dirt All By My Lonely" is the first single released from Naughty by Nature's fifth album, Nineteen Naughty Nine: Nature's Fury. It was the least successful single released from the album, only making it to 9 on the Bubbling Under R&B/Hip-Hop Singles (or 109 on the Hot R&B/Hip-Hop Singles & Tracks).

Single track listing

A-Side
"Dirt All By My Lonely" (Radio Mix)- 3:14  
"Dirt All By My Lonely" (TV track)- 3:14

B-Side
"Dirt All By My Lonely" (Club Mix)- 3:14  
"Dirt All By My Lonely" (Acappella))- 2:54

1999 singles
Naughty by Nature songs
1998 songs
Arista Records singles
Songs written by Treach
Songs written by KayGee
Songs written by Vin Rock
Song recordings produced by Naughty by Nature